The Millionaire Cowboy is a 1924 American silent Western film directed by Harry Garson and starring Maurice 'Lefty' Flynn, Gloria Grey and Charles Crockett.

Cast
 Maurice 'Lefty' Flynn as Charles Christopher Meredyth Jr., aka 'Gallop' 
 Gloria Grey as Pauline Truce 
 Charles Crockett as Granville Truce 
 Frederick Peters as Grafter Torso 
 Daddy Hoosier as Buffalo Jones

References

Bibliography
 Langman, Larry. A Guide to Silent Westerns. Greenwood Publishing Group, 1992.

External links
 

1924 films
1924 Western (genre) films
Films directed by Harry Garson
American black-and-white films
Film Booking Offices of America films
Silent American Western (genre) films
1920s English-language films
1920s American films